Dimbo Atiya is a Nigerian Nollywood producer and director from Nasarawa state. In 2022, he won the 2022 AMVCA Best Africa Magic Original Drama Series category award with the drama series "Halita" he produced beating another six contestants.

References

External links

Living people
Year of birth missing (living people)
Nigerian film directors
Nigerian film producers